The Open Quimper Bretagne is a tennis tournament held in Quimper, France since 2011.

Past finals

Singles

Doubles

References

External links
 

Open Quimper Bretagne
Open Quimper Bretagne
Open Quimper Bretagne

Sport in Quimper
Recurring sporting events established in 2011